Charles Frederick John Gilby (13 December 1900 – 8 June 1985) was a New Zealand rower who competed at the 1930 British Empire Games.

Early life and family
Born on 13 December 1900, Gilby was the son of Charles Horace Gilby, who was principal of Christchurch Commercial College, and his second wife, Gertrude Hilda Gilby (née Johnston). He was educated at Christ's College from 1911 to 1917, and went on to work initially as a mechanical engineer at the Christchurh firm of P. and D. Duncan. On 2 October 1933, he married Gwendolyn Hill at St Mary's Anglican Church, Levin.

Rowing
A member of the Canterbury Rowing Club, Gilby represented New Zealand at the 1930 British Empire Games in Hamilton, Ontario. He was a member of the men's eight that won the silver medal, finishing three-quarters of a length behind the victorious English crew.

Death
Gilby died on 8 June 1985, and was buried at Hautapu Cemetery, Cambridge.

References

1900 births
1985 deaths
Rowers from Christchurch
People educated at Christ's College, Christchurch
New Zealand male rowers
Rowers at the 1930 British Empire Games
Commonwealth Games silver medallists for New Zealand
Commonwealth Games medallists in rowing
Burials at Hautapu Cemetery
20th-century New Zealand people
Medallists at the 1930 British Empire Games